KWPV (104.5 FM) is a radio station licensed to Wynnewood, Oklahoma, United States. The station is currently owned by the Chickasaw Nation.

History
This station was assigned call sign KVOY on February 13, 2014. The station, originally owned by Real Community Radio, was sold to the Chickasaw Nation, owner of KCNP in Ada and its two dependent repeaters, for $14,000 in 2020. The sale was consummated on May 25, 2020.

References

External links

WPV
Radio stations established in 2017
2017 establishments in Oklahoma
Community radio stations in the United States